The 2012 Asia-Pacific Rally Championship season is an international rally championship sanctioned by the FIA. The championship is contested by a combination of regulations with Group N competing directly against Super 2000 cars for points. Australian driver Chris Atkinson won the championship he narrowly lost the previous year, beating the Proton R3 Rally Team he raced for in 2011. His Škoda Fabia won the Rally of Whangarei as well as his home event the International Rally of Queensland as well as finishing second in New Caledonia, Malaysia and China, building up a lead his 2011 teammate and defending champion Alister McRae could not catch once his Proton Satria Neo started winning at the Malaysian Rally and the season ending China Rally. The only other rally winners were Indian Skoda driver Gaurav Gill at the Rallye de Nouvelle Calédonie and Malaysian Proton driver Karamjit Singh. Super 2000 cars dominated results with only New Zealand driver Brian Green finishing in the top three at any event in a Group N car.

Selected entries
The following teams and drivers represent the major entries participating in the 2012 season:

Race calendar and results

The 2012 APRC is as follows:

Championship standings
The 2012 APRC for Drivers points is as follows:

Note: 1 – 12 refers to the bonus points awarded for each leg of the rally for the first five place getters, 1st (7), 2nd (5), 3rd (3), 4th (2), 5th (1). There are two bonus legs for each rally.

References

External links
Official website
APRC Live Podcast
APRC News and Video

Asia-Pacific Rally Championship seasons
Asia-Pacific
Asia-Pacific
Asia-Pacific